The South Lincoln Avenue Historic District lies between Pershing and Summit Streets in Salem, Ohio. Covering 400 acres of land, the district encompasses approximately 108 buildings, primarily residences, that contribute to the significance of the area. The district is notable for the architecture and design of the contributing buildings. Examples of a number of architectural styles are seen, including Mid 19th Century Revival; Victorian; and Federal.

The district was added to the National Register of Historic Places in August 1993.

References

Federal architecture in Ohio
Georgian architecture in Ohio
Victorian architecture in Ohio
Historic districts in Columbiana County, Ohio
National Register of Historic Places in Columbiana County, Ohio
Historic districts on the National Register of Historic Places in Ohio